Emamzadeh Esmail may refer to:
 Emamzadeh Esmail, Chaharmahal and Bakhtiari
 Emamzadeh Esmail, Fars
 Emamzadeh Esmail, Kohgiluyeh and Boyer-Ahmad
 Emamzadeh Esmail, Qom
 Emamzadeh Esmail, Semnan